Georgi Kenchadze (born August 16, 1986 in Tbilisi, Georgia) is a Bulgarian former figure skater of Georgian descent. He is the 2006 & 2007 Bulgarian national silver medalist and the 2005 national bronze medalist. He is a two-time competitor at the World Junior Championships. His twin brother, Leri Kenchadze, has competed in pair skating. George now competes for Bulgaria with his partner Sarah May Coward. They are the current Bulgarian National Ice Dance Champions.

Results

References 

Bulgarian male single skaters
Male single skaters from Georgia (country)
Living people
Figure skaters at the 2007 Winter Universiade
1986 births
Georgian
Georgian emigrants to Bulgaria
Sportspeople from Tbilisi